Deep River is the third studio album (fourth overall) released by American singer-songwriter Hikaru Utada, released on June 19, 2002. It sold just over 2.35 million copies in its first week of release, charting at number one on the weekly, monthly and yearly Oricon charts. Deep River is ranked as Japan's fifth-highest album in debut sales, and eighth in the all-time album sales in Japan.

The final track, "Hikari", would be her first single to reach number one on the Oricon Weekly Singles chart three times, and the Japanese version of the theme song for Square Enix's RPG video game, Kingdom Hearts. The English version, "Simple and Clean", (released on her "Colors" single), also accompanied promotion of Kingdom Hearts in overseas versions. The album was cited by many fans and critics as Utada's most acclaimed work, as well as achieving the Triple Crown at the 17th Golden Disc Awards in Japan.

According to the IFPI, the album is listed at number 18 on the Top 50 Global Best Selling Albums for 2002.

Track listing

All songs were arranged by Kei Kawano and Hikaru Utada, except for the following:
 1. "Sakura Drops" – arrangement: Hikaru Utada and Kei Kawano (the order of the name was changed)
 7. "Tokyo Nights" – with string arrangement: Kei Kawano 
 8. "A.S.A.P." – arrangement: Yuichiro Honda, additional rhythm track arrangement: Kei Kawano and Hikaru Utada
 10. "Final Distance" – with string arrangement: Neko Saito

Singles

Personnel 
Credits adapted from the album’s liner notes.

Vocals 

 Hikaru Utada – lead vocals, backing vocals (all tracks)

Instrumentation

Production 

 Hikaru Utada – songwriting (all tracks), executive production
 Utada Sking Teruzane – executive production
 Miyake Akira – executive production

Technical

Artwork 

 Kiriya Kazuaki – art direction, photography
 Cho Kenji – art direction, design
 Mayama Yuki – styling
 Inagaki Ryoji – hair, make-up

Charts
Japan (Oricon)

References

Hikaru Utada albums
2002 albums
Japanese-language albums
Universal Music Japan albums